State Route 199 (SR 199) is a  state highway in the east-central part of the U.S. state of Georgia. It is a southeast–northwest route through portions of Montgomery, Treutlen, and Laurens counties. It runs from a point north of Mount Vernon northwest to East Dublin.

Route description
SR 199 begins at an intersection with US 221/SR 56, north of Mount Vernon, in Montgomery County. It heads northwest into Treutlen County, where it intersects SR 46 before meeting SR 199 Spur. Continuing northwest, SR 199 enters Laurens County and travels through rural areas before an interchange with Interstate 16 (I-16), southeast of Dublin. It meets its northern terminus, an intersection with SR 29 in East Dublin.

SR 199 is not part of the National Highway System, a system of roadways important to the nation's economy, defense, and mobility.

Major intersections

Bannered route

State Route 199 Spur (SR 199 Spur) is a  spur route of SR 199 that exists entirely within the southwestern part of Treutlen County.

SR 199 Spur begins in a rural part of the county, at an intersection with Troup Road. It heads northeast and curves to the east and curves back to the northeast. It crosses over Red Bluff Creek before it meets its eastern terminus, an intersection with the SR 199 mainline in Lothair.

SR 199 Spur is not part of the National Highway System, a system of roadways important to the nation's economy, defense, and mobility.

See also

References

External links

 Georgia Roads (Routes 181 - 200)

199
Transportation in Montgomery County, Georgia
Transportation in Treutlen County, Georgia
Transportation in Laurens County, Georgia